"Take It Easy" is a song by Australian-New Zealand recording artist Stan Walker from the Mt. Zion film soundtrack (2013). It was released as the first single from the album by Sony Music Australia on 30 November 2012. "Take It Easy" peaked at number five on the New Zealand Singles Chart.

Background
"Take It Easy" was released as a single via digital download in New Zealand by Sony Music Australia on 30 November 2012.

Track listing
Digital download.
"Take It Easy" – 3:20

Charts

Weekly charts

Year-end charts

Certifications

Release history

References 

2012 songs
2012 singles
Stan Walker songs
Songs written by Stan Walker
Sony Music Australia singles